Joanna Townsend is an Australian journalist.  

Townsend was formerly a finance presenter on Nine News, and reporter for Today and Nine News. 

Joanna was also is a fill-in for Nine Early Morning News, Nine Morning News, Nine Afternoon News and Nightline. She was also a regular fill in presenter on Nine News Now a podcast, daily with all the latest news on the day.

She has also worked as a contributing reporter on the ABC's 7:30 Report.

Reporting highlights include live reporting from the 2009 Bangkok riots and ongoing live coverage of the 2008 global financial crisis.

She was described by Ray Martin in his autobiography Ray as a 'TV wizard'. 

Jo has worked on programs such as Nine News, A Current Affair, Today, Sunday, Business Sunday and Nightline before joining the team at 60 Minutes.

Townsend is currently a field producer on 60 Minutes.

References

External links
Joanna Townsend website
Nine News

Living people
Australian journalists
Australian television presenters
Australian women journalists
Australian women television presenters
Year of birth missing (living people)